Emiliano Zapata Municipality is a municipality in Tlaxcala in south-eastern Mexico. As of the 2010 census, the municipality had a total population of 4,146 inhabitants. Its municipal seat, also called Emiliano Zapata, had a population of 2,843 inhabitants. The town stands at an official elevation of 2,884 meters (9,462 ft.), the highest of any municipal seat in Mexico.

References

Municipalities of Tlaxcala